Schüffner's dots refers to a hematological finding that is associated with malaria, exclusively found in infections caused by Plasmodium ovale or Plasmodium vivax.

Plasmodium vivax induces morphologic alterations in infected host erythrocytes that are visible by light microscopy in Romanowsky-stained blood smears as multiple brick-red dots. These morphologic changes, referred to as Schüffner's dots, are important in the identification of this species of malarial parasite and have been associated by electron microscopy with caveolavesicle complexes along the erythrocyte plasmalemma.

They are named for Wilhelm Schüffner, who described them in 1904.

References

External links
 http://pathmicro.med.sc.edu/parasitology/blood-proto.htm
 http://www.wadsworth.org/parasitology/critiquesJun05.htm

Malaria